M2 or m2 may refer to:

 Square metre (m2), an SI measure of area
 M squared (M2), a measure of laser beam quality
 M2 (album), by Marcus Miller
 m2 (artist), German DJ and musician Mathis Mootz

See also
 M2 (disambiguation)
 M (disambiguation)